Bruce Thomas Draine (born November 19, 1947 in Kolkata) is an American astrophysicist. He is Professor of Astrophysical Sciences at Princeton University.

He attended Swarthmore College from 1965 to 1969. He served in the U.S. Peace Corps in Ghana from 1969–71, where he taught secondary school physics and mathematics. He received his Ph.D. from Cornell University in 1978. From 1979 to 1982 he was in the School of Natural Sciences at the Institute for Advanced Study. He currently teaches in the Department of Astrophysical Sciences at Princeton University. His research involves the study of the interstellar medium, especially interstellar dust, photodissociation regions, and interstellar shock waves. 

He is one of the authors (together with Piotr J. Flatau) of the public domain DDSCAT code based on the discrete dipole approximation which has application to light scattering by non-spherical particles and nanophotonics.

Honors and awards
In 2004 he won the Dannie Heineman Prize for Astrophysics for his "fundamental, pioneering studies of interstellar processes". In 2007, he was inducted into the National Academy of Sciences for his work in the field of Astrophysics. He was elected a Legacy Fellow of the American Astronomical Society in 2020.

Books

References

External links 
Bruce T. Draine's Princeton Page

1947 births
Living people
Swarthmore College alumni
Cornell University alumni
Princeton University faculty
Members of the United States National Academy of Sciences
Winners of the Dannie Heineman Prize for Astrophysics
Fellows of the American Astronomical Society